These are the individuals who, at any given time, were considered next in line to inherit the throne of Liechtenstein, should the incumbent monarch die. Those who actually succeeded (at any time) are shown in bold.

This list begins with the reign of Johann I Josef, Prince of Liechtenstein. Liechtenstein follows the Salic law, which means no female member can succeed to the throne, limiting the line of succession to the eligible male-line descendants of Prince Johann I Joseph.

1: In 1923, Prince Franz Josef moved rapidly from fourth in the line of succession to second, only behind the Sovereign Prince's brother Prince Franz, both childless elderly brothers being Franz Josef's first cousins twice removed, as a result of the renunciations of Prince Franz Josef's father, Prince Alois (26 February), and uncle, Prince Franz de Paula (1 March).

See also
 Line of succession to the Liechtensteiner throne

Liechtenstein
Liechtenstein
Liechtenstein politics-related lists